Pankau is a German surname. Notable people with the surname include:

 Carole Pankau (born 1947), American politician, Republican Illinois State Senator
 Herbert Pankau (born 1941), German footballer

See also
 Pankow (surname)

German-language surnames